Marit Dopheide (born 28 December 1990) is a Dutch athlete. She competed in the women's 4 × 400 metres relay event at the 2021 European Athletics Indoor Championships, winning the gold medal.

References

External links

1990 births
Living people
Dutch female sprinters
Place of birth missing (living people)
European Athletics Indoor Championships winners
20th-century Dutch women
21st-century Dutch women